AirLink Express is an air charter airline based in Jamaica. The airline is located at Sir Donald Sangster International Airport (MBJ), Montego Bay. The airline offers charter and scheduled service to every airport in Jamaica. As of June 2018 the Jamaica Gleaner reports that the airline uses a Cessna 208B Grand Caravan

Destinations 

AirLink Express has domestic services from its base at Sangster International in Montego Bay to Negril Aerodrome

The company offers chartered flights from Montego Bay to Ian Fleming International Airport in Ocho Rios and Ken Jones Aerodrome in Port Antonio.

It previously provided scheduled services between Sangster International and Tinson Pen Aerodrome in Kingston.

Fleet 

AirLink Express fleet consisted of

Cessna 206
Cessna 207
Cessna 208
Beech 1900D
Beech 1900C

References

External links
https://airlinkreservations.as.me/schedule.php

Airlines of Jamaica
Airlines established in 1996